Strong Place is the second album by German jazz saxophonist Ingrid Laubrock's Anti-House, a quintet with guitarist Mary Halvorson, pianist Kris Davis, bassist John Hébert and drummer Tom Rainey. It was recorded in 2012 and released on the Swiss Intakt label.

Reception

In his review for AllMusic, Dave Lynch says that the album "is filled with unpredictable twists and turns that keep the listener guessing, while the music nonetheless coheres through recurring motifs and the bandmembers' intuitive grasp of Laubrock's compositional and improvisational language."

The All About Jazz review by John Sharpe states, "Typically the German's charts avoid the obvious. Her convoluted thematic materials arise following an inscrutable inner logic, often juxtaposed with improvised elements, whether solo or group, as they intimate a tangled web of feelings, often within the space of a single number."

In a review for The Guardian, John Fordham notes that the group, "sounds more organised yet spontaneously conversational than ever. Strong Place represents a step-change for Anti-House, offering budding jazz composers fresh ideas and inspiration."

The Point of Departure review by Troy Collins states, "Laubrock's compositional sensibility balances impulsive spontaneity with a structural cohesiveness that occasionally sounds surreal; each of her sophisticated pieces embodies its own distinctive sound world. Although angular themes, oblique harmonies and fractious rhythms dominate her idiosyncratic writing, these works espouse a more consistent and contemplative mood than those found on the quintet’s debut."

Track listing
All compositions by Ingrid Laubrock
 "An Unfolding" – 7:48
 "Der Deichgraf" – 10:25
 "Count 'Em (for Richard Foreman)" – 9:58
 "From Far Girl to Fabulous Vol. 1" – 5:36
 "Alley Zen" – 4:25
 "Strong Place (for Emanuella)" – 6:32
 "Cup in a Teastorm (for Henry Threadgill)" – 6:01
 "Here's to Love" – 6:28

Personnel
Ingrid Laubrock – tenor sax, soprano sax
Mary Halvorson – guitar
Kris Davis – piano
John Hébert – bass
Tom Rainey – drums

References

 

2013 albums
Ingrid Laubrock albums
Intakt Records albums